This list of 2007 motorcycling champions is a list of national or international touring motorcycle sport series with a Championship decided by the points or positions earned by a driver from multiple races.

Road racing
 Grand Prix
 World MotoGP Championship:2007 MotoGP season
Casey Stoner 
 World 250cc Championship:2007 250cc season
Jorge Lorenzo 
 World 125cc Championship:2007 125cc season
Gábor Talmácsi 
 Red Bull MotoGP Rookies Cup
Johann Zarco 
 European 250cc Championship
Alvaro Molina 
 European 125cc Championship
Alen Győrfi 
 All Japan Road Race 250cc Championship
Youichi Ui 
 All Japan Road Race 125cc Championship
Hiroomi Iwata 
 British 125GP Championship
Luke Jones 
 Italian 125cc Championship
Roberto Lacalendola 
 Spanish 125cc Championship
Stefan Bradl 
 German 125cc Championship
Georg Fröhlich 
 Australian 125cc Championship
Glenn Scott 
 Superbike racing 
 Superbike World Championship:2007 Superbike World Championship season
James Toseland 
 British Superbike Championship:2007 British Superbike season
 Ryuichi Kiyonari 
 AMA Superbike
 Ben Spies 
 Parts Canada Superbike Championship
 Jordan Szoke 
 Italian Superbike Championship
 Marco Borciani 
 German Superbike Championship
 Martin Bauer 
 All Japan Road Race Superbike Championship
 Atsushi Watanabe 
 Australian Superbike Championship
 Jamie Stauffer 
 South African Superbike Championship
 Arushen Moodley 
 Finnish Superbike Championship
 Kari Vehniäinen 
 Supersport racing
 Supersport World Championship: 2007 Supersport World Championship season
Kenan Sofuoğlu 
 South African SuperSport
Christopher Leeson 
AMA Formula Xtreme
Josh Hayes
Superstock
 FIM STK1000
Niccolò Canepa 
 FIM STK600
Maxime Berger 
 AMA Superstock
Jamie Hacking 
 FIM Superside
Tim Reeves  & Patrick Farrance

Speedway
 Speedway
 World
Speedway World Championship
Nicki Pedersen 
World Cup
Poland 
Individual Speedway Junior World Championship
Emil Saifutdinov 
Team Speedway Junior World Championship
Poland 
Europe
Individual Speedway European Championship
Jurica Pavlič 
European Pairs Speedway Championship
Czech Republic
Individual Speedway Junior European Championship
Nicolai Klindt 
British Speedway
British Speedway Championship
Chris Harris 
British Speedway Under 21 Championship
Ben Wilson 
British Speedway Under 18 Championship
Tai Woffinden
Elite League Champions
Coventry Bees
Elite League Knockout Cup Winners
Coventry Bees
Craven Shield Winners
Coventry Bees
Pairs Championship
Poole Pirates
Riders Championship
Nicki Pedersen 
 Premier League Champions
Rye House Rockets
Four-Team Championship
Isle of Wight Islanders
Pairs Championship
Isle of Wight Islanders
Riders Championship
James Wright 
Premier Trophy
King's Lynn Stars
 Conference League Champions
Scunthorpe Scorpions
 Four-Team Championship
Scunthorpe Scorpions
 Riders Championship
Tai Woffinden 
Polish Speedway
 Individual Speedway Polish Championship
Rune Holta
 Polish Pairs Speedway Championship
Unia Tarnów
 Speedway Ekstraliga
Unia Leszno
 Pierwsza Liga
Stal Gorzów Wielkopolski
 Druga Liga
Kolejarz Russell 
 Individual Speedway Junior Polish Championship
Paweł Hlib
 Polish Pairs Speedway Junior Championship
Unibax Toruń
 Team Speedway Junior Polish Championship
RKM Rybnik
Swedish Speedway
 Elitserien
Dackarna
 Allsvenskan 
Lejonen

Grasstrack
Grasstrack
ACU British Grasstrack Championships
250cc Solo
Paul Cooper
350cc Solo
Jason Handley
500cc Solo
Glen Phillips
500cc Sidecar
Shaun Harvey/Danny Hogg
1000cc Left Hand Sidecar
Terry Nicholas & Mike Raymond
1000cc Right Hand Sidecar
Colin Blackbourn & Paul Whitelam Jnr
ACU British Under 21
Lewis Denham

Motorcross
 Motocross
 AMA Motocross 250
Grant Langston 
 AMA Motocross 125
Ryan Villopoto 
 FIM MX1 World Motocross Champions
Steve Ramon 
 FIM MX2 World Motocross Champions
Antonio Cairoli 
 FIM MX3 World Motocross Champions
Yves Demaria 
 FIM Sidecarcross World Champions: 2007 Sidecarcross world championship
Daniël Willemsen  / Reto Grutter 
 All-Japan Motorcross IA2
Hiroaki Arai 
 All-Japan Motorcross IA1
Akira Narita	
 All-Japan Motorcross Women's
Saya Suzuki

Supercross
 Supercross
 AMA Supercross 250
James Stewart Jr. 
 AMA Supercross 125 West 
Ryan Villopoto 
 AMA Supercross 125 East
Ben Townley 
 Supercross World Championship
James Stewart Jr.

Flat Track
Flat track
 AMA Flat Track Grand National
Kenny Coolbeth

Trials
Motorcycle trials
World Trials Championship
Outdoor Series
Antoni Bou 
Indoor Series
Antoni Bou 
All-Japan Trials Championship
Ken'ichi Kuroyama 
British Solo Trials Championship
Graham Jarvis

Enduro
Enduro
World Enduro Championship
E1
Juha Salminen 
E2
Mika Ahola 
E3
Iván Cervantes

Drag racing
National Hot Rod Association (NHRA)
NHRA POWERade Drag Racing Series
Pro Stock Motorcycle
Matt Smith

See also
 List of motorsport championships
 List of 2007 motorsport champions
 Motorcycle sport

2007 motorcycling champions
2007 motorcycling champions
2007 champions
 Champions
2007